The Border Group is a Carboniferous lithostratigraphic group (a sequence of rock strata) in southern Scotland and northernmost England. The name is derived from the Scottish Borders region. The rocks of the Border Group have also previously been referred to as the Lower, Middle and Upper Border groups.

References

Carboniferous System of Europe
Geology of England
Geology of Scotland
Geological groups of the United Kingdom
Geologic formations of the United Kingdom